Xenoplia is a genus of moths in the family Geometridae.

Species
Xenoplia contrasqualida Inoue, 1992
Xenoplia foraria (Guenee, 1857)
Xenoplia maculata (Moore, 1868)
Xenoplia trivialis (Yazaki, 1987)

References
Natural History Museum Lepidoptera genus database

Ennominae